Charles Algernon Fryatt (2 December 1872 – 27 July 1916) was a British merchant seaman who was court martialled by the Imperial German Navy for attempting to ram a German U-boat in 1915. International outrage followed his execution by firing squad near Bruges, Belgium. In 1919, his body was reburied with full honours in the United Kingdom.

Early life
Fryatt was born on 2 December 1872 in Southampton, the son of Charles and Mary Fryatt. He attended Freemantle School in the late 1870s. In 1881, Fryatt's family lived at 22 Trinity Terrace, in St Mary's, Southampton, but later moved to Harwich, Essex where he attended the Corporation School. He and his wife, Ethel, had seven children; six girls and one boy. The children were Olive, Victoria, Doris, Vera, Mabel, Charles and Dorothy. The younger Charles later followed his father into the merchant navy, training at HMS Worcester.

On leaving school, Fryatt entered the Mercantile Marine, serving on SS County Antrim, SS Ellenbank, SS Marmion and SS Harrogate. Fryatt rose through the ranks, serving on various ships.

U-boat attack
On 3 March 1915, Fryatt's command, a Great Central Railway ship, was attacked by a German U-boat. With deckhands assisting the stokers, the vessel made  when it would normally have been pushed to make . Wrexham arrived at Rotterdam with burnt funnels. The Great Eastern Railway presented Fryatt with a gold watch for this feat. The watch was inscribed Presented to Captain C. A. Fryatt by the chairman and Directors of the G.E Railway Company as a mark of their appreciation of his courage and skilful seamanship on March 2nd, 1915. Later that month he was in charge of Colchester when it was unsuccessfully attacked by a U-boat.

Seeing the U-boat had surfaced to torpedo his ship, Fryatt ordered full steam ahead and tried to ram U-33, which crash-dived.
This action complied with Winston Churchill's orders to captains of merchant ships, which included treating the crews of U-boats as felons and not as prisoners of war, in consideration of the German Empire's policy of unrestricted submarine warfare. White flags were to be ignored. Churchill's order also stated that survivors from U-boats might be shot if this was more convenient than taking them prisoner. If a captain were to surrender his ship he would be prosecuted by the British. For this second action, Fryatt was awarded a gold watch by the Admiralty. The watch was inscribed Presented by the Lords Commissioners of the Admiralty to Chas. Algernon Fryatt Master of the S.S. 'Brussels' in recognition of the example set by that vessel when attacked by a German submarine on March 28th, 1915. Fryatt was presented with a certificate on vellum by the Lords Commissioners of the Admiralty. He was also praised in the House of Commons.

Capture
On 23 June 1916 Brussels left Hook of Holland bound for Harwich. Lights were shown from the beach and a flare was fired. A passenger is reported to have remained on deck and signalled to shore. Five German destroyers surrounded Brussels. The passengers were told to prepare to take to the lifeboats and orders were given for official papers to be destroyed, which was done successfully. Brussels was taken by the Germans, and the radio was destroyed. She was escorted into Zeebrugge and then to Bruges.

Court-martial

Fryatt and his crew were sent to the civilian internment camp at Ruhleben, near Berlin. On 16 July 1916, the Dutch newspaper De Telegraaf reported that Fryatt had been charged with sinking a German submarine. In reality, U-33 had not been sunk. At the time of the trial she was on active service as part of the Constantinople Flotilla. The basis for the charge was the inscription on his gold watch from the Admiralty. Fryatt was tried at a court-martial by the Imperial German Navy on 27 July 1916, at Bruges Town Hall. Captain Fryatt was found guilty of being a franc-tireur and sentenced to death. The sentence was confirmed by the Kaiser. At 19:00, Fryatt was executed by a Naval firing squad at Bruges within the harbour grounds. The execution was witnessed by one of the town's Aldermen. He was buried in a small cemetery just outside Bruges that was used for burying Belgian civilians executed after being convicted of offenses involving guerrilla warfare or perfidy. The grave was later visited by diplomat Sir Walter Townley (British Ambassador to the Netherlands from 1917 to 1919) and his wife.

An execution notice was published in Dutch, French and German announcing the death of Fryatt. It was signed by Admiral Ludwig von Schröder. A translation of the execution notice reads:

German post-war confirmation of court-martial
On 2 April 1919, a German international law commission named the "Schücking Commission", after its chairman Walther Schücking, reconfirmed Fryatt's sentence: 
The execution by firing squad of Captain Charles Fryatt, ordered by the Court Martial of Bruges following judgment in the court-martial proceedings of 27 July 1916, involves no violation of international law. [However, t]he Commission regrets most deeply the haste with which the sentence was carried out.
The commission's ruling was not unanimous. Two members of the legal review panel, Eduard Bernstein and Oskar Cohn, dissented because in their opinion Fryatt's conviction and execution had been "a serious violation of international law" and "an inexcusable judicial murder".

Reaction

On 31 July 1916, British Prime Minister H. H. Asquith issued a statement in the House of Commons.

Lord Claud Hamilton, MP, Chairman of the Great Eastern Railway, denounced the execution as "sheer, brutal murder". The Mayor of Harwich opened a fund to erect a permanent memorial to Fryatt. A similar fund was opened in the Netherlands.

In the United States, The New York Times denounced the execution as "a deliberate murder". The New York Herald called it "The crowning German atrocity". In the Netherlands, the Nieuwe Rotterdamsche Courant described the execution as "arbitrary and unjust", while the Handelsblad Holland called it "A cowardly murder inspired by hatred and revenge". In Switzerland, the Journal de Genève said "It is monstrous to maintain that armed forces have a right to murder civilians but that civilians are guilty of a crime in defending themselves". The Dutch branch of the League of Neutral States presented the Great Eastern Railway a memorial tablet which was erected at Liverpool Street station.  The memorial was unveiled on 27 July 1917, exactly a year after Fryatt's execution. The scrap value of Brussels was donated towards the cost.

The Great Eastern Railway awarded Fryatt's widow a pension of £250 per annum. The Government granted her an extra £100 per annum pension on top of her entitlement. Fryatt's insurers, the Provident Clerk's Association, paid the £300 that Mrs Fryatt was entitled to immediately, dispensing with the usual formalities. The Royal Merchant Seaman's Orphanage offered to educate two of Fryatt's seven children. The King expressed his indignation and abhorrence at the execution of Fryatt in a letter to Mrs Fryatt.  In the letter, he also wrote: "The action of Captain Fryatt in defending his ship against the attack of an enemy submarine was a noble instance of the resource and self-reliance so characteristic of his profession."

The incident inspired an Australian film, The Murder of Captain Fryatt (1917).

Funeral and reburial

In 1919, Fryatt's body was exhumed and returned to the United Kingdom for burial. Fryatt was one of only three sets of British remains given a state funeral following the end of World War I, the others being Edith Cavell and The Unknown Warrior. His coffin was landed at Dover, and transported in South Eastern and Chatham Railway PMV No.132 to London. On 8 July 1919, his funeral service was held at St Paul's Cathedral. Hundreds of merchant seamen and widows of merchant seamen and fishermen attended. Representing the Government were many members of the Admiralty, the Board of Trade, the Cabinet and the War Office.

The band of the Great Eastern Railway, augmented by drummers from the Royal Marines, played the Dead March. "Eternal Father, Strong to Save" and "Abide with Me" were sung, and a blessing given by the Bishop of London. The route of the coffin to Liverpool Street station was lined with people.

Fryatt was buried at All Saints' Church, Upper Dovercourt. His coffin was carried from the station to the church on a gun carriage. His widow was presented with the insignia of the Belgian Order of Leopold that had been posthumously awarded to Fryatt. Fryatt was also posthumously awarded the Belgian Maritime War Cross. In November 2018, Fryatt's grave was restored after years of neglect.

Namesakes

In Zeebrugge there is a street named after Captain Fryatt – Kapitein Fryattstraat. A wing at Dovercourt Cottage Hospital – which is now known as the Captain Fryatt Memorial Hospital. – was named in Fryatt's honour. A public house in nearby Parkeston is also named in Captain Fryatt's honour.

Commemoration
In 2016, an exhibition was held from 23 to 31 July at the Masonic Hall, Harwich, to commemorate the 100th anniversary of his execution.

See also

Thrasher incident 
Crash of Zeppelin LZ 54 (L 19) – German crew abandoned by British to drown in North Sea

References

Bibliography 
 - Total pages: 128 

 - Total pages: 480 

Notes

External links
Arthur Balfour's comments on Fryatt's execution

 

1872 births
1916 deaths
English sailors
British Merchant Navy officers
Civilians killed in World War I
Civilians who were court-martialed
Executed British people
People executed by Germany by firing squad
People executed by the German Empire
Great Eastern Railway people
Military discipline and World War I
World War I civilian detainees held by Germany
World War I crimes by Imperial Germany
People from Southampton
People from Harwich
British Merchant Service personnel of World War I
Deaths by firearm in Belgium
Executed people from Hampshire
Burials in Essex
Steamship captains